Sam Joseph Ntiro (20 April 1923 – 1 January 1993) was the first East African High Commissioner to the Court of Saint James in London from the then republic of Tanganyika to the United Kingdom. He served Independence in 1961 until 1964. He was also Ambassador of Tanganyika to Ireland during this period.

He was born in the Machame area of Hai District, the village of Ndereny, the Parish of Nkuu. This is in the Kilimanjaro Region of Northwest Tanzania on the slopes of Mount Kilimanjaro in Tanzania. Professor Ntiro attended Ndereny Nkuu Primary School and had his Junior Secondary and Senior Secondary Education at Old Moshi Secondary school in the Marangu area. Throughout his life Professor Ntiro spoke fluent English, Swahili, Kimachame and Kimarangu. he had a working knowledge of Runyoro, Luganda, French, German and Italian.

Sam Joseph Ntiro had his tertiary education at Makerere College of the University of East Africa, then affiliated to the University of London, where he studied Art and Education. He did postgraduate work at the Slade College of Fine Art, University of London. He married Evangeline Sarah Nyendwoha, a Ugandan (Uganda and East Africa's first woman University Graduate), in 1958, and had two sons, Joseph and Simbo (1961–2008).

He taught at Makerere College (now Makerere University), Kyambogo Technical Institute (now Kyambogo University) and the University of Dar es Salaam, where he helped found the Department of Music, Arts and Theatre. In Dar es Salaam he was Resident Artist, Senior Lecturer and at his retirement associate professor. He did research in the United States of America, in the 1970s at Dillard & Xavier Universities in New Orleans, Louisiana and in the 1980s at the University of Wisconsin at Madison in both areas of Fine Art and African Studies. He also served as an external examiner for Fine Art, Art History and sometimes History, Geography in Kenya, Uganda, Tanzania, Malawi, Zambia, Zimbabwe, the United Kingdom, the US, Canada, Ghana and Nigeria.

Between Kyambogo and Dar es Salaam from 1967 to 1973, Ntiro was Commissioner of Culture for the Government of the United Republic of Tanzania. The Department was first in the Ministry of Education and then moved to the Ministry of National Culture and Youth.

1923 births
1993 deaths
Tanzanian diplomats
Ambassadors of Tanganyika
High Commissioners of Tanzania to the United Kingdom
Ambassadors to Ireland
Tanzanian expatriates in Uganda
Tanzanian expatriates in Ireland
In his long and distinguished career, he was a fine artist and painter, a diplomat, public official, a civil servant, and an academic. He travelled extensively and exhibited his works of art throughout the world.